This is a list of vehicular and rail bridges, tunnels, and cuts in Hudson County, New Jersey. Located in the northeastern part of New Jersey Hudson lies at the heart of the Port of New York and New Jersey and is a major crossroads of the New York Metropolitan area and Northeast Megalopolis. Located on two peninsulas, formerly known as Bergen Neck and New Barbadoes Neck, it has extensive waterfront along the Hudson River, Upper New York Bay, Kill van Kull, Newark Bay and the Hackensack and Passaic Rivers. The main part of Hudson lies on Bergen Hill, the southern emergence of the Hudson Palisades, starting at sea level at Bergen Point and rising to 260 feet travelling through Bayonne, Jersey City and North Hudson. Secaucus and most of West Hudson are part of the New Jersey Meadowlands. Listings are generally from south to north.



Hudson River

Kill van Kull and Newark Bay

Hackensack River

Passaic River

Bergen Hill-Hudson Palisades

Meadowlands

Kearny and Croxton in the low-lying Meadowlands supports an infrastructure that includes many unnamed bridges, embankments, flyovers, and causeways. 

The Manhattan Transfer was once located in the Kearny Meadows. The Kearny Connection allows transfer between the Hoboken and Newark Divisions of New Jersey Transit rail operations for its Waterfront Connection. The Sawtooth Bridges carries the Northeast Corridor over NJ Transit, PATH, and Conrail.

The Main, Bergen County, Pascack Valley, Meadowlands, and Port Jervis lines uses a series of embankments and bridges to cross the Meadowlands. Planned expansion of Secaucus Junction includes a massive loop.  Numerous junctions, including the Marion, and the Northern Running Track are part of the Conrail's North Jersey Shared Assets Area, a component in the national freight rail network. Much of the New Jersey Turnpike travels along a causeway.  Nearby Snake Hill, Exit 15's huge horseshoe-shaped U-turn rises above the rail yards and lines below it.

See also
List of bridges documented by the Historic American Engineering Record in New Jersey
List of tunnels documented by the Historic American Engineering Record in New Jersey
Timeline of Jersey City area railroads

References

External links
Bridgesnyc.com
NJ bridges
The Bridges of New Jersey
Partial list HC bridges
North Jersey.com: Bridges are man-made marvels of the Hackensack River
NY Society of model engineers tour of NJ rr tunnels

Bridges, tunnels, and cuts in Hudson County

Hudson County

Port of New York and New Jersey
Buildings and structures in Jersey City, New Jersey
Buildings and structures in Newark, New Jersey
Hackensack River
Transportation in Hudson County, New Jersey
Tourist attractions in Hudson County, New Jersey
Bridges, tunnels, and cuts in Hudson County
Bridges, tunnels, and cuts in Hudson County
New Jersey
New Jersey